Chorto is a seaside village is the municipal unit of Argalasti in Magnesia, Greece. Its population in 2011 was 147. Chorto is located by the Pagasetic Gulf, 4 km south of Argalasti. There are several beach hotels and restaurants in the village. The ancient city of Spalathra was situated near Chorto. Located in the centre of Chorto is the museum Aggelini, which has a great range of old books, traditional objects of everyday use and many valuable relics. There are many hiking trails known as Kalderimi in the South Pelion area, which is a network of stone paths dating back a few hundred years. Chorto is also known for its two theatres, indoor and outdoor, which hosts musicians from all over the world.

Population

External links
 Chorto on GTP Travel Pages

See also
 List of settlements in the Magnesia regional unit

References

Populated places in Magnesia (regional unit)